Ryan White (1971–1990) was an American teenager who became a national poster child for HIV/AIDS in the United States.

Ryan White may refer to: 

 Ryan White (filmmaker), American documentary producer and director 
 Ryan White (ice hockey) (born 1988), Canadian ice hockey center
 Ryan White (basketball) (born 1988), American basketball player

See also
Rhyan White (born 2000), American swimmer